Datang Telecom Technology Co., Ltd., known as Datang Telecom or DTT, is a Chinese listed company based in Beijing, China. It is a subsidiary of state-owned "China Academy of Telecommunications Technology" (CATT), which had a trading name Datang Telecom Group.

History
In 1998 "China Academy of Telecommunications Technology" had transformed from a research institute to both research institute and holding company, by incorporating a subsidiary Datang Telecom Technology (DTT) on 21 September 1998 under the Companies Law of China. On 21 October 1998 DTT became a public company in the Shanghai Stock Exchange. The research institute also had a new trading name Datang Telecom Group.

In 2012 Datang Telecom Technology acquired 75.88% stake of Leadcore Technology from the parent entity.

In 2017, Leadcore formed a Sino-foreign joint venture with Qualcomm and other investors. It was approved by the Chinese regulator in 2018.

In May 2018, due to heavy net loss in 2017 financial year, the company was marked as *ST (* special treatment) by the Shanghai Stock Exchange. It was reported that the company facing delist from the exchange.

References

External links
 

Companies based in Beijing
Chinese companies established in 1998
Telecommunication equipment companies of China
Government-owned companies of China
Chinese brands
Companies listed on the Shanghai Stock Exchange